Nea Marshall Kudi Ngwa (born March 20, 1980) better known by his stage name BeBe Zahara Benet, is a Cameroonian-American drag performer, television personality, and musician best known for winning the first season of the reality-television drag competition RuPaul's Drag Race in 2009. In 2018, he returned as a surprise contestant for the third season of RuPaul's Drag Race: All Stars, placing in the top four.

His first EP, Face, was released in 2014, followed by his second EP, Kisses & Feathers, in 2017. His third EP, Broken English, was released in 2020. As of 2019, he stars in the TLC transformational makeover television series Dragnificent, as the event planning expert. In 2021, he starred in Being Bebe, a film documenting fifteen years of his life.

Early life
Ngwa was born and raised in Cameroon. His family later moved to France where Ngwa lived until he settled in Minneapolis at age nineteen to complete his college studies and to be closer to family.

Career 
Benet's first experience with drag was at a Paris fashion show, where he was asked to put on a dress to walk the runway as a female as a last-minute replacement for an absent model. His first drag performance was alongside Cyndi Lauper in The Gay 90s bar after moving to Minneapolis in 2000. She has participated in drag pageants, including Miss US of A.

RuPaul's Drag Race and other television 
In early 2009, Ngwa, after a suggestion from RuPaul herself after seeing him perform to "Circle of Life" at Minneapolis Pride, auditioned for the first season of Logo's reality-TV drag-queen competition RuPaul's Drag Race.
She eventually became one of nine queens cast in the season, having been selected out of thousands of applicants. He was the inaugural winner of the series, having won two challenges during the competition. Bebe's win would inspire many soon-to-be drag queens to pursue the art of drag, including eventual Drag Race season 8 winner Bob The Drag Queen.

In 2011, Benet appeared in two episodes of RuPaul's Drag U, serving as a "drag professor".

Benet was revealed as the surprise 10th contestant on the third season premiere of RuPaul's Drag Race: All Stars, becoming the first-ever winner in the show's history to return for an All-Stars season. He reached the season finale, having won two challenges, but was not chosen to advance to the final two by a jury of previously eliminated queens and subsequently finished in joint third place with Shangela.

Benet appeared with Jujubee, Thorgy Thor, and Alexis Michelle in the TLC television special Drag Me Down the Aisle which aired on March 9, 2019, and was later picked up as a series and re-titled Dragnificent.

Music 
Benet's first dance single, "I'm the Sh*t", has been remixed by Felix Baumgartner, Ralphi Rosario and Mark Picchiotti. He released his second single, "Cameroon" in July 2010. Benet made a cameo appearance in the music video for Erasure's re-release of their song A Little Respect, in December 2010 (which was a fundraiser for students of the Harvey Milk Institute in San Francisco). He released his third single "Dirty Drums" on April 17, 2012 via iTunes. His fourth single, "Face," was released on March 3, 2014.

Benet recorded a cover of "Little Drummer Boy" for the Drag Race Christmas Queens 4 album.

Other ventures and tours 
In November 2017, Ngwa was a featured performer in Queens United, a benefit show created by Phi Phi O'Hara in an effort to raise money to people affected by Hurricane Maria.
In 2018, Ngwa created "Roar", a monthly show featuring interacting dancing.

In 2020, they co-created, produced, and headlined the Nubia tour, a live Drag Show celebrating Black drag queens through original music, group choreography, video installations, live vocals, lip syncs, and narrative-driven performance art. On opening night, Vulture.com praised the cast, RuPaul’s Drag Race alum; Bob The Drag Queen, Peppermint, Shea Couleé, The Vixen, and Monique Heart, noting the “touching sincerity” and “joyous” celebration of black culture featured in the show.

The tour began its run with sold-out shows in New York City, and has plans to visit Los Angeles, as well as other major cities across the United States.

In June 2021, Ngwa will be featured in "Gospel Brunch Drag Show", an "LGBTQIA+ Youths Of Color Celebrate Black Pride" event, and the virtual "Pride Bigger Than Texas" event livestreamed from the Bonham Exchange. In August 2021, they will be a featured performer and in Klub Kids London Presents: NOIR: The Tour, where 25% of the proceeds from the production will be donated to the Black Lives Matter movement.

A documentary film titled Being Bebe premiered at the 2021 Tribeca Film Festival from June 19–23, 2021, and later screened at the Provincetown International Film Festival on June 23, 2021, and screened for three days. The film documented the past fifteen years of Ngwa's life as Bebe Zahara Benet, including his journey preparing for RuPaul's Drag Race. The film won the 2021 Best Documentary Award at the Provincetown International Film Festival.

Outside of drag, Ngwa is the CEO of The Lavish Labs, an event planning and decor firm.

Personal life 
Prior to starting drag, he was a choir director and music teacher. He doesn't consider himself a drag queen, and prefers to be called a "drag artist" or "drag performer". Ngwa is a devout christian.

He has named Christian Dior, Giorgio Armani, and Alphadi as personal fashion icons.

Filmography

Film

Television

Web series

Music Videos

Discography

Extended plays

Singles

As lead artist

As featured artist

Guest appearances

References

External links
 
 Bebe Zahara Benet discography on Discogs

1980 births
Living people
African-American drag queens
Cameroonian drag queens
Cameroonian entertainers
People from Minneapolis
RuPaul's Drag Race winners
RuPaul's Drag Race All Stars contestants
American LGBT singers
Cameroonian LGBT people
21st-century Cameroonian male singers
21st-century African-American male singers